Rectification has the following technical meanings:

Mathematics
 Rectification (geometry), truncating a polytope by marking the midpoints of all its edges, and cutting off its vertices at those points
 Rectifiable curve, in mathematics
 Rectifiable set, in mathematics

Science
 GHK flux equation#Rectification, in biology, a process in cell membranes

Technology
 Image rectification, adjustment of images to simplify stereo vision or to map images to a map coordinate system (GIS)
 The function of a rectifier, a device that converts alternating electrical current to direct current
 Rectified airspeed, a means of displaying the airspeed of high-speed aircraft
 Rectification  (chemical/process engineering), countercurrent distillation, a unit operation also used for the production of rectified spirit (see Distillation#Fractional distillation)

Other uses
 Rectification (law), an equitable legal remedy whereby a court orders a change in a written document to reflect what it should have said in the first place
 Rectification, in astrology, "rectification of the birth time" is used when natal birth time is imprecise
 Rectification movement (disambiguation)
 Rectification of names, a practice in Confucian philosophy 
 Rectification, a process that creates a rectified spirit (alcohol)

See also
Rectification movement (disambiguation)
 Rectifier (disambiguation)
Rectify, American television series

ja:蒸留#精留